The 1966 New York Jets season was the seventh season for the team in the American Football League (AFL). The season began with the team trying to improve on their 5–8–1 record from 1965 under head coach Weeb Ewbank. The Jets finished the season 6–6–2.

Roster

Standings

Season schedule

External links
1966 team stats

New York Jets seasons
New York Jets
New York Jets
1960s in Queens